Saidus Salehin Khaled Sumon (born 8 January 1973), popularly known by his nickname  Bassbaba Sumon, is a Bangladeshi rock singer-songwriter, bass player, composer, music producer and founder of the Bangladeshi rock band Aurthohin. He is the band leader and spokesperson of Aurthohin since the beginning.

Sumon was born and raised in Dhaka. He started learning bass by himself at the age of 14. He first auditioned for rock band Feelings in 1990 at the age of 16 and joined the band that year. He had played in 11 bands by the age of 19. In 1996, he joined Warfaze and later appeared in the band's 1998 hit album "অসামাজিক (Antisocial)" and left the band. In 1997, his first solo album "সুমন ও অর্থহীন (Sumon and Aurthohin)" got released while he was in Warfaze. Later, after leaving Warfaze, he formed Aurthohin.

He is mostly known for his slapping and tapping style in bass playing and is considered to be the most influential and greatest bassist in the country. His style of playing bass and success in music has earned him the title "Bassbaba" (Father of Bass). World's renowned Bass Player magazine described him as a "Bangladeshi Bass Pioneer".https://www.instagram.com/p/CdNsrd6pWws/?hl=en

Early life

Sumon was born in 1973 in Dhaka, Bangladesh to Nazmul Ahsan Khaled and Shamsun Nahar Khaled.  He attended Government Laboratory High School. After that, he completed his graduation from Dhaka City College. He started playing Hawaiian guitar at the age of 7. In an interview, Sumon stated that he was unable to buy a Spanish guitar, so he took his Hawaiian guitar to a shop and converted it into a Spanish guitar. He picked up his first Spanish guitar and formed his first band when he was 12. One day he was seeing an Iron Maiden show on TV. He was heavily inspired by Steve Harris. Since then he started playing the bass guitar. He was 14. He joined one of the most popular bands in Bangladesh 'Feelings' as a bassist when he was 16 where he played with the greatest rockstar of Bangladesh, Faruq Mahfuz Anam, commonly known as James. He did the first ever unaccompanied bass solo in Bangladesh when he was 17.https://www.guitarworld.com/features/bassbaba-sumon-soul-food

Career

He played with 11 bands by the age of 19. He also wrote, sang, and produced his first solo album when by that time. He is known for his nice grooves, excellent use of different bass playing techniques, and, mostly, for his frequent bass solos in his band Aurthohin's songs.

Bangladesh is a country where rock music, especially metal and alternative rock, is getting popular and Bassbaba Sumon is credited as one of the few most influential artists in this sector. He has single-handedly changed the role of bass guitar in Bangladeshi Music. It is said that bass playing has become a hugely attractive thing to the young music lovers of this country only because of the influence of Bassbaba Sumon. He is also a key figure in promoting Rock music in this country.

In 2016 he released his first solo bass album named "Soul Food Part 1".In the album, Sumon collaborated and featured world-renowned musicians, the likes of Felix Pastorius, Robert ‘Bubby’ Lewis, Josh Cohen, Bob Franceschini, J.D. Blair and Erfan Nazem Zadeh. Talented Bangladeshi drummer Mark Don is also featured in one of the tracks.

Influence and playing styles
Sumon has cited Steve Harris as his primary influence for switching to bass from guitar. He was also inspired by various funk bassists such as Victor Wooten, Billy Sheehan and Stuart Ham. He mostly plays with slapping and tapping. His slapping technique helped Aurthohin bring funky sound. His notable solos are - Shaat Din, Guti (The Finale), Surjo 2, Nirbodh, Nikkrishto 3, Punorjonmo (Guti-5), Cancer Casserole, Better call Salt & The Walking Bread, Tapping Tempura, etc.

====

Illness and recovery
After the release of Aurthohin's fourth album, ' Dhrubok', Sumon's health deteriorated. In 2011, it was announced that he had a spine and stomach cancer. After surgery and chemotherapy, Sumon was pronounced cancer-free in 2013. He also suffered from skin cancer and a brain tumour. He wrote a song about his illness, "Cancer", which appeared on ' Aushomapto 2. Later cancer came back several times but he recovered. He also had a road accident and broke several bones including some discs. He also had a stroke and the left side of his body was paralysed for almost 2 months but eventually, he recovered. In his life, he had to go through a total of 36 surgeries, but he never gave up. After four years of break, he came back with his band Aurthohin with a bang on the 17th of December 2021 in front of 35,000 people. Fans went crazy. People literally cried after seeing him performing again. Aurthohin became one of the most respected and popular bands in Bangladesh in 2022. He also released a single called 'Boyosh holo Amar'.

Personal life
Sumon is an entrepreneur. He is the director of the Khaled Group of Companies. He is the director of over 20 well-known companies in Bangladesh. He has a wife named Nazia Salehin Khaled (1996-present), who sang with him on his tribute album for John Denver. (Methopoth,shopner daar and bohudure). He has two children named Ahnaf Salehin Khaled and Aurora Salehin Khaled. Both of his children sang with him on his album Boka Manushta' when they were only 9 and 3 years old..He also has three siblings. Shamsul Arefin Khaled(elder brother, has been mentioned in some interviews), Saiful Arefin Khaled(younger brother) (wrote half of the hit "odbhut shei chheleti while thinking of Bassbaba, as per Kishor alo magazine, also wrote some other songs of Aurthohin, Shahina Khaled (sister). Sumon is also a landscape photographer.

DiscographySolo albums "সুমন ও অর্থহীন (Sumon and Aurthohin)" (1997)
 "স্বপ্নগুলো তোমার মতো (The Dreams are Like You)" (2001)
 "মেঘের দেশে (In the Country of Clouds)" (2005)
 "সুমন ও অর্থহীন-২: বোকা মানুষটা (Sumon and Aurthohin-2: The Foolish Man)" (2007)
 Soul Food: Part One (2016)Collaborated albums "এখন আমি (Now Me)" ft. Fuad al Muqtadir and Anila (2007)Warfaze "অসামাজিক (Antisocial)" (1998)Aurthohin'''
 "ত্রিমাত্রিক (Three-Dimensional)" (2000)
 "বিবর্তন (Evolution)" (2001)
 "নতুন দিনের মিছিলে (New Day Procession)" (2002)
 "ধ্রুবক (Constant)" (2003)
 "অসমাপ্ত (Unfinished)" (2008)
 "অসমাপ্ত ২ (Unfinished II)" (2011)
 "ক্যান্সারের নিশিকাব্য (Cancer Nishivabya)" (2016)
 "ফিনিক্সের ডায়েরী ১ (Phoenixer Diary 1)"'' (2022)
 Singles:
 Kokhono (Tarader Gunjone) (1999)
 Jodi Kobhu (6 Band, '99) (1999)
 Anubhobe (Jewel with the Stars)
 Notun Ami (Jewel with the Stars)
 Ektu Ghum (Rock with Radiomania)
 Olotpalot (Bappa with Rockers)
 Valo Lage Na (Bappa with Rockers)
 Aaj Eshechhi (Coming Back to Life) (2011)
 Protichhobi 2012 (Online Release) (2012)
 Maa (Online Release) (2013)
 Chador (Online Release) (2013)
 Amjonota (Online Release) (2013)
 Kothay Tumi (Online Release) (2014)
 Walter White (Online Release)
 Hridoyer Smrititgulo (Online Release) (2014)
 Purano Sei Diner Kotha (Online Release) (2016)
 Oniyomer Golpo (Sumon Featuring Furti) (Online Release) (2018)
 Prothom (Film- Unoponchash Batash ) (2020)
 Boyosh Holo Amar (Online Release) (2021)
 Amar E Gaan ( online Release) (2022)

See also
 Artcell
 Cryptic Fate

References

External links 

 
 
 

Bass guitarists
Living people
1973 births
People from Dhaka
Progressive metal bass guitarists
21st-century Bangladeshi male singers
21st-century Bangladeshi singers
20th-century Bangladeshi musicians
21st-century Bangladeshi musicians
20th-century bass guitarists
21st-century guitarists
Bangladeshi guitarists
Male bass guitarists
21st-century bass guitarists
20th-century Bangladeshi male singers
20th-century Bangladeshi singers